Acarosporina is a genus of lichenized fungi within the family Stictidaceae. The genus was circumscribed in 1977 and contains about four species.

References

Ostropales
Lichen genera
Ostropales genera
Taxa described in 1977